Johansson is a patronymic family name of Swedish origin meaning "son of Johan", or "Johan's son". It is the most common Swedish family name, followed by Andersson. (First 18 surnames ends -sson.)
The Danish, Norwegian, German and Dutch variant is Johansen, while the most common spelling in the US is Johnson.  There are still other spellings.  Johansson is an uncommon given name.

Geographical distribution
As of 2014, 91.2% of all known bearers of the surname Johansson were residents of Sweden (frequency 1:39), 2.5% of Finland (1:802), 1.5% of Norway (1:1,274), 1.4% of the United States (1:93,010) and 1.0% of Denmark (1:2,022).

In Sweden, the frequency of the surname was higher than national average (1:39) in the following counties:
 1. Kalmar (1:21)
 2. Kronoberg (1:21)
 3. Halland (1:21)
 4. Jönköping (1:25)
 5. Västra Götaland (1:26)
 6. Blekinge (1:29)
 7. Östergötland (1:30)
 8. Värmland (1:30)
 9. Västerbotten (1:36)
 10. Gotland (1:36)
 11. Örebro (1:39)

In Finland, the frequency of the surname was higher than national average (1:802) in the following regions:
 1. Åland (1:51)
 2. Southwest Finland (1:383)
 3. Ostrobothnia (1:487)
 4. Uusimaa (1:521)

People
 Anders Johansson, Swedish heavy metal drummer
 Annika Johansson, Swedish freestyle skier
 Ann-Sofie Johansson, Swedish fashion designer, former Head of Design for H&M
 Bernt Johansson, Swedish road bicycle racer, 1976 Olympic champion
 Bo Johansson, football (soccer) coach
 Calle Johansson, a retired professional ice hockey defenceman
 Carl Edvard Johansson, Swedish inventor (of the gauge block set)
 Elinore Johansson (born 1996), Swedish handball player
 Ejner Johansson (1922-2001), Danish art historian and documentary film director
 Fannie Gaston-Johansson, American professor of nursing
 Ingebrigt Johansson, Norwegian mathematician
 Inge Johansson, Swedish chess player
 Ingemar Johansson, Swedish boxer, heavyweight world champion 
 Ivar Lo-Johansson, Swedish proletarian author
 Jan Johansson, jazz pianist
 Jens Johansson, heavy metal keyboardist
 Joachim Johansson, Swedish tennis player
 Jóhann Jóhannsson, Icelandic Composer
 Johan J. Johansson, American Medal of Honor recipient
 Jonatan Johansson, Finnish footballer
 Josef Johansson, Swedish pop singer and songwriter
 Karl Henrik Johansson, Swedish engineer
 Leif Johansson (businessman), Swedish Chairman of Ericsson
 Lena Johansson (born 1969), Swedish politician
 Lennart Johansson, Swedish sports official, former President of the European Football Federation
 Marcus Johansson, multiple people
 Martin Emanuel Johansson, Swedish chess master
 Martina Johansson, Swedish politician
 Mathilde Johansson, French female tennis player
 Nanna Johansson, Swedish cartoonist
 Olof Johansson, Swedish politician, former leader of Centerpartiet
 Ove Johansson, native Swede and American football placekicker
 Scarlett Johansson, American actress, singer and producer
 Stefan Johansson, Formula One driver
 Stefan Johansson (racewalker), Swedish race walker
 Thomas Johansson, Swedish former tennis player
 Victor Johansson, Swedish swimmer
 Viktoria Johansson, Swedish chess player
 Wiktoria Johansson, Swedish singer and songwriter
 Ylva Johansson, Swedish politician, European Commissioner for Home Affairs

See also
 Johansen
 Johanson
 Johannsen

References

Swedish-language surnames
Patronymic surnames
Surnames from given names